Tamarine Tanasugarn and Sonchat Ratiwatana are the defending champions of the Mixed Doubles competition of the 2011 Southeast Asian Games. Tanasugarn decided not to participate. Ratiwatana partnered with Varatchaya Wongteanchai but the pair lost in the quarterfinals to Denise Dy and Treat Conrad Huey. Dy and Huey eventually won the title by beating Jessy Rompies and Christopher Rungkat 4–6, 6–3, [10–6] in the final.

Medalists

Draw

Seeds

All seeds received bye to the quarterfinals.

  Varatchaya Wongteanchai /  Sonchat Ratiwatana (quarterfinals)
  Nungnadda Wannasuk /  Sanchai Ratiwatana (semifinals)
  Jessy Rompies /  Christopher Rungkat (final)
  Grace Sari Ysidora /  Aditya Hari Sasongko (semifinals)

Main draw

References
Draw
SEAG2011 Start/Result Lists - Tennis

Mixed Doubles